No longer in service, the Greenbelt–BWI Thurgood Marshall Airport Express Line (commonly shortened to the Greenbelt–BWI Airport Line), designated Route B30, was a weekday-only bus route operated by the Washington Metropolitan Area Transit Authority between Baltimore-Washington International Thurgood Marshall Airport and the Greenbelt station of the Green and Yellow Lines of the Washington Metro. When it last ran, the line operated every 70 minutes five days a week along the Baltimore–Washington Parkway between these two locations with no intermediate stops, with the exception of the BWI Business District Light Rail Stop and Arundel Mills Mall, and the last bus leaving BWI at 10:09 pm. The trip was approximately 50 minutes long.

Service
Service operates every 70 minutes between Greenbelt station and Baltimore-Washington International Thurgood Marshall Airport on weekdays only. WMATA uses 6 2006 New Flyer D40LFRs numbered 6212–6217 to operate on the route based out of Landover Division. However, other buses can be used on the route if the D40LFRs are running on other routes or going under maintenance. The original vehicles used were now retired 1997 Orion Vs numbered 4390–4395. Each bus has suburban seating with overhead luggage racks with a larger luggage rack in the middle of the bus.

Stops

Background
Service began on November 16, 2001 to connect service to BWI Airport from Prince George's County.

The line is unique for being the only WMATA bus line that has a connection with any Maryland Transit Administration non-commuter services, and is responsible for providing a regular link between the two services. The original $3 one-way fare was seen as a bargain compared with other transportation modes in the area, including Greyhound and MARC Train Service.

In 2007, it was reported that the B30 line was partly responsible for BWI Airport ranking as one of the nation's top 10 airports in ease of access.  WMATA also provides higher levels of service on the line in special times of need, especially on certain holidays.

The state of Maryland, which provides funds for operating the service, has been criticized for doing little to promote its use.

2017 Service Changes
Between 2016–17, WMATA proposed to eliminate the B30 route completely due to the route under-performing under WMATA standards.

On June 25, 2017, weekend service for the B30 was discontinued and the one-way fare for the route was increased to $7.50 making the B30 bus a more expensive option than the MARC train. Buses also increase head-ways from 40 to 60 minutes.

2018 Service Changes
On June 24, 2018, the B30 was rerouted to serve Arundel Mills via Arundel Mills Boulevard.

On December 30, 2018, head-ways were increased from 60 to 70 minutes.

Proposed elimination
Through the years, WMATA proposed to eliminate all route B30 service due to low ridership and multiple alternative services. The route last operated on March 17, 2020 due to Metro's response to the COVID-19 pandemic.

See also

 D.C.–Dulles Line

References

External links
 Metrobus

B30
Transportation in Maryland
Baltimore/Washington International Airport
Greenbelt, Maryland